The Wigan by-election of 4 March 1948 was held after the death of the incumbent Labour MP, William Foster.

The by-election was contested by four candidates: Ronald Williams (Labour), Harold Dowling (Conservative), Thomas Rowlandson (Communist), and Owen L Roberts (King's Cavalier). Roberts was an ex-RAF Pathfinder observer fighting the election 'for the peace and prosperity of the country.'

The result was a hold for the Labour Party, with Williams gaining 59.1% of the vote, in spite of a 6.5% swing to the Conservative Party.

Result of the by-election

Result of the previous General Election

References

Further reading
 Craig, F. W. S. (1983) [1969]. British parliamentary election results 1918-1949 (3rd edition ed.). Chichester: Parliamentary Research Services. . 
 

Wigan 1948
Wigan
Wigan
1940s in Lancashire
Elections in the Metropolitan Borough of Wigan
Wigan 1948
Wigan